Drift is the ongoing music-and-video experiment by the British electronic music group Underworld, launched on 1 November 2018, with consecutive tracks and music videos having been released online, on a weekly basis. Individual new tracks were made available through the band's official website, as time-limited free downloads, along with accompanying videos published on YouTube — followed by collective "episodes" released as digital EPs on music streaming platforms. Throughout the first year of Drift, 38 new tracks were released within five Episodes and an additional soundtrack album. It is the band's second project distributed digitally, after the 2005–2006 series Riverrun.

Underworld planned to conclude Drift after its 52-week run with a collective album, but decided to continue the project for another year. On 1 November 2019, an album Drift Series 1, compiling all EPs and featuring additional 11 new tracks, was released as a 7-CD, 1 Blu-ray box set, as well as digitally, along with a single-disc Drift Series 1 Sampler Edition. In September 2020, Drift Series 1 was re-released, with additional eighth CD with a live performance.

Background 
Karl Hyde and Rick Smith's aim was to release new and previously unreleased music, film, and written stories throughout a full year, on a weekly basis, every Thursday, "and see where the journey took them." They admitted that the episodic idea for the project "grew out of boredom," jokingly adding later in the project it was "a foolhardy promise made in public." The duo wanted to disrupt the single-album-tour cycle, which for them repeats roughly every three years, by letting themselves to create instinctively and responsively, explaining "you want every day to be a challenge, particularly when it comes to making music." "Whether it's good or bad, we'll record with more honesty in this one year than we have in the previous fifteen... I mean, come on! We’ve got to try that."

Drift has its roots in earlier online Underworld projects, including the archive music released freely through underworldlive.com starting in 2000, the Riverrun project in 2005, and the band's live webcasts from 2004 to 2008. In April 2018, Underworld released by surprise their first new track since 2016's Barbara Barbara, We Face a Shining Future, "Brilliant Yes That Would Be", and in June 2018 an unfinished version of "Appleshine", each with a video directed by Underworld's art director Simon Taylor, of the band's own design-and-film collective Tomato. These releases foreshadowed the project and were later included in Drift releases.

The duo initiated Drift having been inspired by a conversation with the band's lighting designer Haydn Cruickshank, who has been a drift racer. The project's name also referenced the movie series The Fast And The Furious, particularly one of its sequels, Tokyo Drift (although, the theme of the drifting motorsport was already present in the band's 2010 video for "Scribble"). Drift's first video to "Another Silent Way" featured racing at the Rockingham Motor Speedway. The majority of Drift music videos was directed by Taylor, shot "from Shibuya Crossing to the Moroccan desert to rural Essex." At times, the videos were said to be delivered twenty four hours before they went live. Other contributions to the project included works of playwrights, DJs, painters, and poets. The first trailer for the project's Episode 1 was published on 25 October 2018.

Compositions of the first year of Drift feature collaborations with the Australian experimental jazz band The Necks, London producer Ø [Phase] aka Ashley Burchett, actor Matthew Trevannion, members of the rock band Black Country, New Road (including Georgia Ellery, Lewis Evans, and Karl Hyde's daughter Tyler Hyde), as well as Ichirou Agata of the Japanese noise rock band Melt-Banana.

Reflecting on the project, the band described the scale of Drift as "the most inspiring process that [they've] ever engaged in" yet relentless — "There's no expansion space... you can't get ill. You can't go on holiday. You don't have weekends" — and regretted how the rapid schedule made collaborating with other artists difficult, desiring to build more time into a second series.

Release format 
New songs and video were released on YouTube each Thursday, for a total of five or six weeks in a row. The Thursday after the final song of each episode, the full episode would be released on streaming services and digital retail as an EP. Certain songs were released as digital singles ahead of their episodes.

Often, songs were altered between their video and final release - notably, the video release of "Mile Bush Pride" includes an outro that was later cut, the final version of "Molehill" was given an extended coda, and "Beautiful Yes That Would Be" was originally reworked as a brief intro to Episode 1, then extended on the box set release. The songs of Episode 1 were re-ordered and mixed to play continuously, later episodes did not follow this practice and Episode 1 was restored to its original order for the box set.

Between each Episode, Underworld published unreleased material, new remixes, live rehearsal recordings, DJ mixes, and other items from the band's archives (See: Archival tracks and mixes). These releases were often curated by Junior Boy's Own founder Steven Hall, and were compiled in a digital download for the Drift Series 1 box set.

The Guardian "socialist banger" 
On 21 May 2019, Underworld released a new version of the track "Soniamode", originally featured on February's Episode 2 — Atom. Now dubbed "Soniamode (Aditya Game Version)," it featured lyrics written by The Guardian columnist and economics commentator Aditya Chakrabortty. The band's publicist knew Chakrabortty's 2018 column series The Alternatives, "about how to make the economy work for everyone," asked him to email a list of inspirational people, ideas, and processes, for the band, and the list ended up as a chorus for the track.

Drift Series 2 

In September 2020, when asked about the status of the ongoing Drift project, Smith responded "Series 2? We’re already there, though, we’re just trying to figure out how to roll it out," and elaborated "Drift has always been happening, and Series 2 is merely a chosen starting point: a time and place."

Although no official announcement about Drift 2 has been made, in October 2021 Underworld released Dark & Long 3 EP including a remix subtitled "Drift 2 Dark Train."

Drift Series 1

Drift Series 1 is the tenth studio album by the British electronic group Underworld, released on 1 November 2019. It is the conclusion of the first year of the band's year-long music-and-video experiment Drift, and the band's first full-length release since 2016's album Barbara Barbara, We Face a Shining Future.

The band planned to conclude the project after its 52-week run, posting on 21 May 2019 details about the new album Drift Songs, as a single-CD, double vinyl, and a 6-CD, 1-Blu-ray box set. But with the release of the last song of Episode 5, on 12 September 2019, Underworld announced the Drift project would continue on for another year. The now-renamed Drift Series 1, was released exactly one year after the launch of the series, as a box set featuring 7 CDs, a Blu-ray, and an 80-page book documenting the creative process around Drift.

A single-disc Drift Series 1 Sampler Edition was also released simultaneously, the Sampler Edition is a continuous mix of select songs from the series, many edited into shorter versions.

The full edition of Drift Series 1 features the expanded and reproduced tracks, videos and written text released throughout the series, and material the duo worked on but wasn't releasing before and during the Drift project. Each episode is presented across 5 separate CDs with some slight changes — Episode 1 was unmixed and reverted to its original release order, "Soniamode" was replaced with the Aditya Game version, all three collaborations with The Necks were moved to their own CD, and additional unreleased songs were added to the end of every episode. The seventh CD includes the Sampler Edition of the album.

With the September 2020 re-release of Drift Series 1, the set will contain an additional CD with the live-set RicksDubbedOutDriftExperience, recorded in at Ziggo Dome in Amsterdam on 23 November 2019.

Critical reception 
Drift Series 1 received critical acclaim from critics. At Metacritic, which assigns a normalised rating out of 100 to reviews from mainstream critics, the album received an average score of 86, based on 7 reviews, which indicates "universal acclaim". It is the band's most acclaimed studio album on the site to date. Mixmag applauded the album "absolutely stunning": "[While] certainly raw and reminiscent of a free-flowing jam session at times, what's particularly commendable is how beautifully produced each track is, with a discernible intention toward the arrangement of layers to establish powerful, thematic settings."

Accolades

Charts

Manchester Street Poem participation 
 
In July 2017, Underworld recorded music for the live installation Manchester Street Poem at the Manchester International Festival. The project told stories of people in Manchester who find themselves homeless. On 13 June 2019, the complete score to the project was made available to download, with proceeds going toward the ongoing Manchester Street Poem project, dedicated to people who experienced homelessness. The album was promoted by the single "Doris," which was released on Drift Episode 4 on the same day as the full score.

Track listing 
The following is a chronological list of tracks released subsequently as digital Drift EPs. Track lengths adapted from music streaming platforms.

Episodes

Episode 1 — Dust

Episode 2 — Atom

Episode 3 — Heart

Episode 4 — Space

Episode 5 — Game

Drift Series 1 collective release 
Details of the physical and digital release, which collects tracks from the Drift Episodes.

Manchester Street Poem Installation Score

Series 1'''s archival tracks and mixes ===
The following is a chronological list of previously unreleased tracks, remixes, continuous mixes, and live rehearsal recordings, published on Thursdays, between Series 1 Episodes. The tracks were released on various platforms, and released as a collection in lossless WAV, available by a download code included in the Drift box set.

=== Border Country (The Remixes) EP ===

=== RicksDubbedOutDriftExperience (Live in Amsterdam)''

References

External links 

Underworld (band) albums